The Minister for Water and Power heads the Ministry of Water and Power. The following is the list of all the previous Water and Power ministers of Pakistan to date.

List of Ministers for Water and Power of Pakistan

See also

Constitution of Pakistan
President of Pakistan
Prime Minister of Pakistan
Finance Minister of Pakistan
Interior Minister of Pakistan

External links
 Ministry of Foreign Affairs
 Parliamentary Cabinet of Pakistan